Rafael Durval da Costa Lira or simply Rafael (born 26 December 1982) is a Brazilian born, Azerbaijani futsal player who plays for Mimel Lučenec and the Azerbaijan national futsal team.

References

External links
UEFA profile

1982 births
Living people
Azerbaijani men's futsal players
Araz Naxçivan players